William Veeck may refer to:

William Veeck Sr. (1876–1933), president of the Chicago Cubs Major League Baseball (MLB) franchise from 1919 to 1933
Bill Veeck (1914–1986), son of William Veeck, Sr. and owner of several MLB teams: Philadelphia Phillies, Cleveland Indians, St. Louis Browns, and Chicago White Sox